Dunc's Doll is the second novel in the Culpepper Adventures series by Gary Paulsen. It is about Dunc Culpepper and Amos who are trailing a band of thieves who have stolen a doll, once belonging to Charles Dickens's daughter. It was published on June 1, 1992 by Dell Publishing.

Novels by Gary Paulsen
1992 American novels